Saparda (or Sparda), was an ancient land (720–670 BC), south of Zikirti, corresponding to the modern Bijar area in northwestern Iran.

At the time of the Medes and Assyrians this tribe was dominated by the latter. About 670 BC, Dusanni, king of Sparda, joined the rebellion led by Kashtariti, king of the Medes, against Assyria. 

Historical regions of Iran